Corazon Juliano-Agrava (Manila, 7 August 1915 - Quezon City, 1 October 1997), was a Filipino judge and the second woman in 1954 appointed as judge of a Court of First Instance. She was then president of the Court for Youth and Home Affairs in Manila.  Agrava gained worldwide fame when in 1984, she was appointed the chairperson of a fact-finding board commission by President Ferdinand Marcos to investigate the cause of the murder of opposition leader Benigno Aquino Jr. in 1983. She has also been active in various other social and cultural organizations, including the Women Rights Movement of the Philippines, the Philippine Association of University Women, the National Civic Assembly of Women and U.P. Alumni Association.

Investigation on Benigno Aquino Jr.'s assassination

Agrava Board

In October 1983, President Ferdinand Marcos signed the Presidential decree no. 1886, known as the "Agrava Fact-Finding Board" to investigate the assassination of opposition senator Benigno Aquino Jr. Marcos appointed Agrava to be the chairperson of the board, members are Luciano Salazar, Dante Santos, Ernesto Herrera, Amado Dizon, and legal counsel Andres Narvasa. After almost a year, the board submitted two reports to Marcos; a minority report submitted by Agrava herself, and a majority report submitted by the members. Agrava's report cleared General Fabian Ver while the majority report indicted Ver, General Luther Custodio and General Prospero Olivas.

She even used to scold the soldiers on the witness stand, as if they were her children. Also, she once led the board to sing "Happy Birthday" for First Lady Imelda Marcos twice, because Marcos was the first one to be called to testify before the investigative commission on her birthday.

In October 1984, after a year of investigation, she was called out of retirement. Lupino Lazaro, the lawyer of the family of scapegoat Rolando Galman said, "I felt since the very beginning that Justice Agrava did not have the makings of someone who would go all out. She has failed the people, and failed miserably at that." Agrava, who was in tears and choking voice addressed the crowd saying,

Personal life

Born on August 7, 1915, by Cenona Buenaventura and Francisco Juliano. Agrava became an attorney after placing second and passed the 1938 bar exam. She became judge of Juvenile and Domestic Relations Court until 1977 when Marcos uplifted her as Associate Justice at the Court of Appeals of the Philippines.

She was married to Federico Agrava, a lawyer, but childless. But she became the "unofficial guardian" of hundreds of so-called Filipino 'street kids'.

Organizations 

In 1947, she founded the UP Women Lawyer's Circle (WILOCI) at the request of Former President Manuel Roxas.

Agrava was one of the women who incorporated and registered the FIDA Philippine Branch based on the FIDA which was a group of women lawyers, together with Josefina Phodaca-Ambrosio, Pacita de los Reyes-Philips, Ameurfina Melencio-Herrera, Agustina Rosette-Navarro, Carolina Basa-Salazar, Medina Lacson-de Leon, Milagros German, Remedios Nufable-Gatmaitan, Lumen R. Policarpio, Pilar Perez-Nable, Lilia de Jesus-Sevilla. Magdalena Lapus-Lazaro, Gregoria Cruz-Arnaldo and Remedios Mijares-Austria.

Charitable work

In 1969, Agrava founded the Tahanan Outreach Projects and Services Inc. (TOPS), a social service organization that delivers learning and childcare projects for the welfare of underprivilege children. The program created a shelter for children as well.

Death

Agrava died on October 1, 1997, at the age of 82 in Quezon City, from heart failure.

See also
Assassination of Benigno Aquino Jr.

References

1915 births
1997 deaths
20th-century Filipino lawyers
Filipino women judges
Filipino jurists